Fernando de Szyszlo Valdelomar (5 July 1925 – 9 October 2017) was a Peruvian painter, sculptor, printmaker, and teacher who was a key figure in advancing abstract art in Latin America since the mid-1950s, and one of the leading plastic artists in Peru.

Life
Szyszlo was born in Lima, Peru; his mother was Peruvian of Spanish-Indian descent, and his father was a geographer from Poland. In 1943, Szyszlo entered the architecture school of the National University of Engineering, but abandoned plans to follow that profession and enrolled in the School of Plastic Arts of the Pontifical Catholic University of Peru. After his graduation in 1948, he traveled to Europe where he studied the works of the masters, particularly Rembrandt, Titian and Tintoretto, and absorbed the varied influences of Cubism, Surrealism, Informalism, and abstraction. Szyszlo lived in Paris and Florence from 1948 to 1955, and then returned to Peru. While in Paris he met Octavio Paz and André Breton and was part of the group of expatriate Latin American artists and writers who met regularly at the Café de Flore, engaging in vigorous discussions on how they could participate in the international modern movement while preserving their Latin American cultural identity. Upon his return to Peru, Szyszlo became a major force for artistic renewal in his country breaking new ground by expressing a Peruvian subject matter in a non-representational style. In 1962, he became a professor of art at Cornell University. In 1965 he became a visiting lecturer at Yale University. Szyszlo was married to the Peruvian poet Blanca Varela (1926–2009), with whom he had two children. At the time of his death, he resided and worked in Lima. He died on October 9, 2017, the same day as his second wife, Lila Yábar(m.1988) in a domestic accident according to his secretary.

Work 

His work is represented in  public and private collections throughout the world, including the Museum of Modern Art, New York; Solomon R. Guggenheim Museum, New York; Anita Shapolsky Gallery, New York; Museum of Fine Arts, Houston; Art Museum of the Americas, Washington, D.C.; Museo de Arte de Lima (Peru); Museu de Arte Moderna, São Paulo, Brazil; Museo Nacional de Arte, La Paz, Bolivia; Museo de Arte Contemporaneo Arequipa (Peru); and the Museum of Latin American Art, Long Beach, California, among others.

References 

The Organization of American States

External links
Fernando de Szyszlo on Artnet
Fernando de Szyszlo, represented by Latin American Masters
Fernando de Szyszlo at MLA Gallery, Los Angeles 
Fernando de Szyszlo at Anita Shapolsky Gallery, New York
 Fernando de Szyszlo at Mixografia, Los Angeles 

1925 births
2017 deaths
Szyslo, Fernando de
Modern artists
Contemporary painters
Abstract artists
Szyslo, Fernando de
Szyslo, Fernando de
Peruvian people of Polish descent